The 2000 United States presidential election in West Virginia took place on November 7, 2000 as part of the 2000 United States presidential election. Voters chose 5 representatives, or electors to the Electoral College, who voted for president and vice president.

West Virginia gave its 5 electoral votes to the Republican nominee, Governor of Texas George W. Bush, marking the first time a Republican carried the state since Ronald Reagan in 1984, and only the fourth time since 1932. While West Virginia was traditionally a Democratic stronghold, this election marked the beginning of a political realignment. The Mountain State would become the only state to vote against George H. W. Bush twice and for George W. Bush twice. It is also the only state lost by George H. W. Bush in 1988 to be carried by George W. Bush in 2000.  The state was also won by Bill Clinton twice but voted against Gore who at the time of the 2000 presidential election was serving under Clinton as Vice President.  , this is the last election in which the Democratic candidate won Kanawha County, Harrison County, Lincoln County, and Wyoming County. This was the first time since 1928 that a non-incumbent Republican won West Virginia, and was only the fourth time since that election where a Democrat lost the state.

As of 2020, this is the last presidential election in which a Democrat won any congressional district in the state and the last time the state was won by single digits.

Primaries
2000 West Virginia Democratic primary
2000 West Virginia Republican primary

Results

By county

Counties that flipped from Democratic to Republican
Barbour (Largest city: Philippi)
Cabell (Largest city: Huntington)
Calhoun (Largest city: Grantsville)
Clay (Largest city: Clay)
Gilmer (Largest city: Glenville)
Greenbrier (Largest city: Lewisburg)
Hancock (Largest city: Weirton)
Hardy (Largest city: Moorefield)
Jackson (Largest city: Ravenswood)
Jefferson (Largest city: Charles Town)
Lewis (Largest city: Weston)
Marshall (Largest city: Moundsville)
Mason (Largest city: Point Pleasant)
Mercer (Largest city: Bluefield)
Monongalia (Largest city: Morgantown)
Monroe (Largest city: Peterstown)
Nicholas (Largest city: Summersville)
Ohio (Largest city: Wheeling)
Pendleton (Largest city: Franklin)
Pleasants (Largest city: St. Marys)
Pocahontas (Largest city: Marlinton)
Raleigh (Largest city: Beckley)
Randolph (Largest city: Elkins)
Roane (Largest city: Spencer)
Summers (Largest city: Hinton)
Taylor (Largest city: Grafton)
Tucker (Largest city: Parsons)
Tyler (Largest city: Paden City)
Wayne (Largest city: Kenova)
Wetzel (Largest city: New Martinsville)

By congressional district
Bush won 2 of the 3 congressional districts, including one that elected a Democrat.

References

West Virginia
2000
2000 West Virginia elections